Sickla kanalbro (Swedish: "Sickla Canal Bridge") is a bridge in central Stockholm, Sweden. Stretching over Sickla kanal ("Canal of Sickla"), it connects Södra Hammarbyhamnen to Nacka. The name Sickla is believed to be derived from a 15th-century provincial word, sik, meaning "minor marsh".

A product of post-WW2 traffic loads, the bridge was built 1954-1955 as a continuous steel girder bridge resting on four supports and carrying a concrete roadway. 60 metres long and 10,3 metres wide, the bridge passes over three spans with a maximum span of 23 metres and an average horizontal clearance over the canal of 4,6 metres. The supports are built on a foundation of concrete poles, while the abutments are resting directly on the bedrock. The bridge was originally built with a future widening in mind, something which had to wait until 1979 when a 2,6 metres wide cantilevering pathway was added on the south side of the roadway.

References

See also 
 List of bridges in Stockholm
 Danviksbron
 Sicklauddsbron
 Sickla sluss

Bridges in Stockholm
Bridges completed in 1955
1955 establishments in Sweden